Hasan Kacić (born 29 July 1976) is a Croatian retired football defender of Bosnian descent.

Club career
He played for HNK Dubrovnik, Slaven Belupo, Belgian First Division side Lierse and Prva HNL side NK Istra 1961. At Lierse, Kacić was suspended for two years in 2007 due to his alleged involvement in a match-fixing scandal surrounding Chinese businessman Ye Zheyun.

Managerial career
He was manager of GOŠK Dubrovnik in 2021, but returned to coach at the club's academy after the arrival of Frane Lojić in 2021.

References

External links
 
Hasan Kacić profile at Nogometni Magazin 

1976 births
Living people
Sportspeople from Dubrovnik
Bosniaks of Croatia
Association football defenders
Croatian footballers
NK Slaven Belupo players
Lierse S.K. players
NK Istra 1961 players
NK GOŠK Dubrovnik players
Croatian Football League players
Belgian Pro League players
Croatian expatriate footballers
Expatriate footballers in Belgium
Croatian expatriate sportspeople in Belgium
Croatian football managers
NK GOŠK Dubrovnik managers